Hagi Šein (also, Hagi Shein; born 13 September 1945) is an Estonian journalist, film director, screenwriter, professor, media pedagogue and former figure skater.

Šein was born into a Jewish family in Tallinn. In 1973 he graduated cum laude from Tartu State University, majoring in history and sociology. He then completed his postgraduate studies in television journalism and telesociology at the Department of Journalism at Moscow State University. In 2001, he received a master's degree in journalism from the University of Tartu. In 2007, he completed his doctoral studies in television history and media policy. In 2002, he was elected professor of telemedia for five years by the Council of Concordia International University Estonia.

Šein trained as a figure skater for eleven years and with partner Madli Krispin, won a silver medal in pair skating at the 1962 Estonian Figure Skating Championships.

From 1967 until 1997, he worked at Eesti Televisioon (ETV). From 1992 until 1997, as ETV's chief director. He has been the author of many television series, including Prillitoos (1983-1990), Mõtleme veel (1987-1989).

Šein has taught television at Tartu State University (1976–1986). From 1997 to 2003, he worked as the Dean of the Faculty of Media at Concordia International University, then at International University Audentes (2003–2006) and the Baltic Film, Media, Arts and Communication School of Tallinn University (Acting Director and Director, 2006–2011).

He is currently a lecturer in television at the Baltic Film, Media, Arts and Communication Institute of Tallinn University and the editor-in-chief of the Estonian Film Database. He is also a member of the council of the Estonian Film Institute, the council of Tallinnfilm and the council of the Estonian National Archives.

As a screenwriter and director, Šein has made 12 documentaries, including Ratastoolitants (1986), Raudrohutee (1985) and Lepatriinutalv (1989). He has also written research on the history of Estonian television, the most important of which include Suur teleraamat (TEA Kirjastus, 2005), Televisioon Eestis 1955–2004 (University of Tartu Publishing House, 2004) and Eesti telemaastik 1991–2001. Uurimused. Diskussioon. Teabekogud (University of Tartu Publishing House, 2002).

Acknowldgements
 Order of the White Star, IV Class (2002)
 Order of the National Coat of Arms, III Class (2006)

References

Living people
1945 births
Estonian journalists
Estonian film directors
Estonian scholars
Estonian screenwriters
Estonian male pair skaters
University of Tartu alumni
Academic staff of Tallinn University
Recipients of the Order of the White Star, 4th Class
Recipients of the Order of the National Coat of Arms, 3rd Class
Estonian Jews
People from Tallinn